Branne is the name or part of the name of several communes in France:

 Branne, Doubs, in the Doubs department
 Branne, Gironde, in the Gironde department
 Saint-Aubin-de-Branne, in the Gironde department

Other
 Branne (grape), another name for the French wine grape Gouais blanc